Southampton County is a county located on the southern border of the Commonwealth of Virginia.  North Carolina is to the south. As of the 2020 census, the population was 17,996. Its county seat is Courtland.

History
In the early 17th century, the explorer Captain John Smith founded the settlement of Jamestown; in the next decades of the colony's history, Jamestown settlers explorer and began settling the regions adjacent to Hampton Roads. The Virginia Colony was divided into eight shires (or counties) with a total population of approximately 5,000 inhabitants in 1634.  Most of Southampton County was originally part of Warrosquyoake Shire.  The shires were soon to be called counties.  In 1637 Warrosquyoake Shire was renamed Isle of Wight County.

In 1749, the portion of Isle of Wight County west of the Blackwater River was organized as Southampton County.  Later, part of Nansemond County, which is now the Independent City of Suffolk, was added to Southampton County. This area was cultivated for tobacco and later for mixed crops, dependent on the labor of enslaved African Americans after a relatively short period when many white indentured servants came to the colony.

In August 1831, an enslaved preacher named Nat Turner led a slave rebellion in Southampton County against local white residents, killing about 60 people (mainly women and children). The rebellion was crushed, and Turner and his rebels were tried, convicted, and executed. Meanwhile, white mobs had seized and lynched nearly 200 black residents of Southampton County, most of them enslaved.

Southampton County may have been named by Virginian settlers for Southampton, a major port city in Hampshire.  Alternatively, it may have been named for Henry Wriothesley, one of the founders of the Virginia Company.

Geography

Southampton County is bounded by the Blackwater River on the east and the Meherrin River on the west.  The Nottoway River flows through the center of the county.  All three rivers are tributaries of the Chowan River, which flows south into Albemarle Sound, North Carolina.  The Blackwater River separates Southampton County from Isle of Wight County, and the Meherrin River separates it from Greensville County.

Adjacent counties

Major highways

Demographics

2020 census

Note: the US Census treats Hispanic/Latino as an ethnic category. This table excludes Latinos from the racial categories and assigns them to a separate category. Hispanics/Latinos can be of any race.

2010 Census
As of the census of 2010, there were 18,570 people, 6,279 households, and 4,502 families residing in the county. The population density was 29 people per square mile (11/km2). There were 7,058 housing units at an average density of 12 per square mile (5/km2). The racial makeup of the county was 60.4% White, 37.2% Black or African American, 0.3% Native American, 0.2% Asian, 0.0% Pacific Islander, 0.3% from other races, and 1.4% from two or more races. 1.1% of the population were Hispanic or Latino of any race.

There were 6,279 households, out of which 30.80% had children under the age of 18 living with them, 54.10% were married couples living together, 13.50% had a female householder with no husband present, and 28.30% were non-families. 24.90% of all households were made up of individuals, and 11.10% had someone living alone who was 65 years of age or older. The average household size was 2.53 and the average family size was 3.02.

In the county, the population was spread out, with 22.70% under the age of 18, 8.80% from 18 to 24, 29.20% from 25 to 44, 25.00% from 45 to 64, and 14.20% who were 65 years of age or older. The median age was 39 years. For every 100 females there were 111.70 males. For every 100 females age 18 and over, there were 112.50 males.

The median income for a household in the county was $33,995, and the median income for a family was $41,324. Males had a median income of $32,436 versus $20,831 for females. The per capita income for the county was $16,930. About 11.70% of families and 14.60% of the population were below the poverty line, including 19.90% of those under age 18 and 14.50% of those age 65 or over.

Public service 
Blackwater Regional Library is the regional library system that provides services to the citizens of Southampton.

Communities

Towns
 Boykins
 Branchville
 Capron
 Courtland
 Ivor
 Newsoms

Census-designated places
 Sedley
 Southampton Meadows

Other unincorporated communities
 Berlin
 Black Creek
 Drewryville
 Vicksville

Politics

Notable people
 John Brown, fugitive slave
 Anthony W. Gardiner, ninth president of Liberia, established as a US colony in West Africa for free blacks; emigrated there from Southampton County
 S. Bernard Goodwyn, chief justice of the Supreme Court of Virginia
 William Mahone, railroad builder, U.S. Senator, and Confederate general
 Dred Scott, slave immortalized by the Dred Scott Decision of the US Supreme Court, which limited the rights of African Americans
 George Henry Thomas, US Army officer
 Nathaniel "Nat" Turner, slave rebellion leader
 Bill Bailey (dancer)  African-American tap dancer, the first person recorded doing the moonwalk (dance) and older brother of actress and singer Pearl Bailey

See also
 National Register of Historic Places listings in Southampton County, Virginia

References

External links
 Southampton County Website
 Hampton Roads Economic Development Alliance – serving Southampton County
 Newsoms Peanut Shop
 Turtle Creek Horse Transportation

 
1749 establishments in Virginia
Virginia counties
Populated places established in 1749